Dan Lanning (born April 10, 1986) is an American football coach and former player who is currently the head coach at the University of Oregon. He previously served as the defensive coordinator and outside linebackers coach at the University of Georgia from 2019 to 2021.

Lanning played college football at William Jewell College as a linebacker from 2004 to 2007. Prior to his tenure at Oregon, he held various assistant coaching positions at Park Hill South High School in Kansas City, Missouri, the University of Pittsburgh, Arizona State University, Sam Houston State University, the University of Alabama, the University of Memphis, and the University of Georgia.

Playing career
Lanning played linebacker at William Jewell College in Missouri from 2004 to 2007. While attending William Jewell, he lived in a house on Elizabeth Street and was roommates with Trent Figg, now an offensive analyst under Lanning at Oregon.

Coaching career

Early career
After his playing career at William Jewell ended, Lanning spent three seasons working at Park Hill South High School as the special teams coordinator, defensive backs coach, and wide receivers coach. Aspiring to be an NCAA Division I football coach, Lanning drove thirteen hours to Pittsburgh to convince the coaching staff led by Todd Graham, who he had met at coaching clinics attended by the Park Hill South staff at Tulsa. He was subsequently hired as a graduate assistant at Pittsburgh for one season before following Graham to Arizona State as a graduate assistant. He was promoted in 2013 to the on-campus recruiting coordinator. He was hired away to be the defensive backs coach and co-recruiting coordinator at Sam Houston State in March 2014. He spent 2015 as a graduate assistant at Alabama, where the Crimson Tide defeated Clemson 45–40 in the CFP National Championship game.

Lanning was hired to be the inside linebackers coach and recruiting coordinator at Memphis in December 2015, reuniting with Mike Norvell who was the offensive coordinator at Arizona State when Lanning was a graduate assistant and on-campus recruiting coordinator.

Georgia
Lanning was hired in 2018 by Georgia as the outside linebackers coach.

After Bulldogs defensive coordinator Mel Tucker left to accept the head coaching position at Colorado after the 2018 season, Lanning was promoted to defensive coordinator in addition to his duties as the outside linebackers coach.

Following Georgia's victory in the Sugar Bowl, Lanning received a raise to $1.25 million. In 2021, Lanning was considered for the Kansas head coach vacancy. However, the position ended up going to Lance Leipold.  

In Lanning’s final year, Georgia would finish undefeated in the regular season, going on to win the 2021-2022 College Football Playoff by defeating the Michigan Wolverines (34-11) in the Orange Bowl Semi-Final and the Alabama Crimson Tide (33-18) in the National Championship Game.

Oregon
On December 11, 2021, Lanning was named  the 35th head coach at the University of Oregon, replacing Mario Cristobal after his departure to become the head coach at the University of Miami. Lanning signed a six-year, $29.1 million contract with the Ducks.

Personal life
Lanning and his wife, Sauphia, have three children. While at Memphis, Sauphia was diagnosed with osteosarcoma and underwent chemotherapy treatments. Sauphia was deemed cancer-free in 2017 after months of treatments.

Head coaching record

References

External links
 Oregon profile
 Georgia profile
 Memphis profile
 Sam Houston State profile
 Arizona State profile

1986 births
Living people
American football linebackers
Alabama Crimson Tide football coaches
Arizona State Sun Devils football coaches
Georgia Bulldogs football coaches
Memphis Tigers football coaches
Oregon Ducks football coaches
Pittsburgh Panthers football coaches
Sam Houston Bearkats football coaches
William Jewell Cardinals football players
High school football coaches in Missouri
People from Richmond, Missouri
Sportspeople from the Kansas City metropolitan area
Coaches of American football from Missouri
Players of American football from Missouri